Astro Citra is a 24-hour Malay language version of HBO Asia, showing the local and Asian movies. The channel began broadcasting on 1 June 2009, replacing Astro Kirana (Channel 122) which ceased its broadcasting on 18 May 2009 due to low viewership. Most of the movies are available in Malay and English subtitles. It is only available on Astro Channel 131 on the Mustika package. All movies are also shown on Astro Mustika HD, although during the latter's start of broadcast, only local films were shown. Starting 1 October 2018, Astro Mustika HD will renamed Astro Citra HD and will be renumbering to Channel 126.

References
Astro Citra TV Guide

Astro Malaysia Holdings television channels
Television channels and stations established in 2009